František Plass (18 April 1944 – 5 May 2022) was a football player and manager. He made 164 appearances in the Czechoslovak First League, scoring 16 goals, as well as two appearances in the European Cup Winners' Cup. He played for Czechoslovakia, representing his country 11 times between 1968 and 1972. Plass later worked as a manager, taking charge of numerous teams between 1981 and 1998. He led Dukla Prague during the 1992–93 Czechoslovak First League, but was replaced after 16 games by Jiří Fryš, with the club going on to finish the season in 14th place.

References

External links 

1944 births
2022 deaths
Sportspeople from Plzeň
Czech footballers
Czechoslovak footballers
Association football defenders
Association football midfielders
Czechoslovakia international footballers
FC Viktoria Plzeň players
Czech football managers
Czechoslovak football managers
FC Viktoria Plzeň managers
FK Chmel Blšany managers
Dukla Prague managers
FK Ústí nad Labem managers
FK Hvězda Cheb managers